Christopher Johnston (1856–1914) was an American physician and Assyriologist, a scholar of ancient Mesopotamia.

Christopher Johnston may also refer to:
Chris Clavin (Christopher Johnston, born 1979), musician and record label owner
Chris Johnston (footballer) (born 1994), Scottish footballer
Christopher Johnston, Lord Sands (1857–1934), law lord and Unionist Party (Scotland) Member of Parliament

See also
Chris Johnson (disambiguation)